Farewell, My Beautiful Naples may refer to:
 Farewell, My Beautiful Naples (1946 film), an Italian musical melodrama film
 Farewell, My Beautiful Naples (1917 film), an Italian silent romance film